Michael George McGovern (born July 1, 1964) is an American prelate of the Roman Catholic Church. He has served as bishop of the Diocese of Belleville in Illinois since 2020.

Biography

Early life 
Michael McGovern was born in Chicago, Illinois on July 1, 1964. He is a native of the Chicago's Beverly neighborhood, and grew up in a large Catholic family.  He attended St. Ignatius College Prep in Chicago serving as a lector there and at his family's church. McGovern attended Loyola University Chicago, where he earned a Bachelor of Sacred Theology degree.  After working for four years, he entered the University of Saint Mary of the Lake in Mundelein, Illinois in 1990.

Priesthood 
On May 21, 1994, Cardinal Joseph Bernardin ordained McGovern to the priesthood for the Archdiocese of Chicago in Holy Name Cathedral in Chicago.  McGovern then served as an associate pastor at Queen of the Universe Parish in Chicago (1995-1998), St. Mary Parish in Lake Forest, Illinois (1998-1999), and St. Juliana Parish in Chicago (2003-2004). 

On December 15, 2004, McGovern was assigned as pastor of St. Mary Parish.  After serving there for 12 years, he was appointed pastor of St. Raphael the Archangel Parish in Old Mill Creek, Illinois on July 1, 2016.From 2013 to 2019, McGovern was a board member of St. Ignatius College Prep.McGovern served as the dean of Deanery 1-A (2007-2020).  He was named as the interim vicar of the archdiocese in February 2020.

Bishop of Belleville
On April 3, 2020, Pope Francis appointed McGovern as bishop for the Diocese of Belleville. His consecration took place on July 22, 2020, at the Cathedral of Saint Peter in Belleville.  His principal consecrator was Cardinal Blase Cupich.

On October 27, 2020, McGovern removed Reverend Anthony Onyango from his position as administrator for two parishes, citing an allegation of "inappropriate behavior" with a minor.

In July 2022, McGovern announced the planned sale of the diocesan bishop's residence and his move to a more modest space in the Cathedral of St. Peter rectory.  The money from the sale, he announced, would be used to subsidize various ministries and charities, including the establishment of a fund benefiting expectant mothers and children.

See also

 Catholic Church hierarchy
 Catholic Church in the United States
 Historical list of the Catholic bishops of the United States
 List of Catholic bishops of the United States
 Lists of patriarchs, archbishops, and bishops

References

External links
Roman Catholic Diocese of Belleville Official Site
Roman Catholic Archdiocese of Chicago Official Site

1964 births
Living people
21st-century Roman Catholic bishops in the United States
Clergy from Chicago
Bishops appointed by Pope Francis